Lionel Escombe (1876 – 15 October 1914) was a British male tennis player. He competed for Great Britain in the tennis event at the 1908 Summer Olympics where he took part in the men's indoor singles and indoor doubles event. In the singles competition he lost in the first round to Gunnar Setterwall in straight sets. In the doubles he partnered with Major Ritchie and after a bye in the quarter finals reached the semifinal in which they were defeated by compatriots Arthur Gore and Herbert Roper Barrett. They subsequently lost the match for third place, and the bronze medal, against Wollmar Boström and Gunnar Setterwall.

Escombe's best performance at a Grand Slam tournament was reaching the quarter final in the men's singles event at the 1907 Wimbledon Championships which he lost in five sets to Wilberforce Eaves. He equaled this performance at the 1907 Wimbledon Championships, this time losing to Herbert Roper-Barrett in straight sets.

Escombe won the Championship of Lucerne in 1902 and the Spanish Championships in 1905.

In 1909 he was runner-up in the men's singles event at the South African Championships, losing in the final to compatriot and multiple Wimbledon champion Reginald Doherty in straight sets.

He died in London on 15 October 1914 as a result of an aneurism.

References

External links
 

1876 births
1914 deaths
19th-century male tennis players
British male tennis players
Olympic tennis players of Great Britain
Tennis players at the 1908 Summer Olympics
Date of birth missing
People from Colony of Natal
Deaths from aneurysm